The 1945–46 English football season was Aston Villa's only season in the Football League South. Like all English clubs, Villa lost seven seasons to the Second World War, and that conflict brought several careers to a premature end. The team was rebuilt under the guidance of former player Alex Massie for the remainder of the 1940s.

George Cummings was the Villains club captain from 1945 to his retirement in 1949, and was popular with supporters due to his never-say-die spirit and no-nonsense defending.

Football League South

References

External links
AVFC History: 1945–46 season

Aston Villa F.C. seasons
Aston Villa F.C. season